Indrai Fort  / Indragiri Fort is a fort located 75 km from Nashik, in Nashik district, of Maharashtra. This fort though is an important fort in Nashik district but, it is less visited by the trekkers. In Chandwad taluka, there are 4 forts in a line on the Satmal hill range,  the Chandwad fort, Indrai fort, Rajdher fort, and Koldher fort. This fort is easy to climb but requires 3 hours to reach the fort.

History
Much less history about this fort is known. This fort was surrendered to Captain Mackintosh in 1818 after the garrison in the fort saw burning of the neighboring Rajdher fort.

How to reach
The nearest town is Chandwad which is 69 km from Nashik. The base village of the fort is Indraiwadi which is 9  km from Chandwad. There are good hotels at Chandwad, now tea and snacks are also available in small hotels at Indraiwadi. The trekking path starts from the hillock south of the Indraiwadi village. The route is very safe and passes through dense scrubs. There is no marked path that leads to the fort. it is advisable to hire a local guide from the village. It takes about two hours to reach the scarp of the fort. a narrow path along the base of the scarp takes a northern detour to reach the rock-cut steps. The steps are 2m wide and 150 in number. It takes about 15 minutes to climb the steps. The entrance gate is nowhere seen. There is plenty of water available on the fort. The night stay on the fort can be made in the caves on the fort.

Places to see
The rock-cut steps form a valley leading to the fort. A rock-cut inscription in Persian language is seen on the walls on the entrance. There are many rock-cut water cisterns on the fort. The Kacheri, the Mahadev temple, and 10 rock-cut caves are the places to be seen. It takes about one hour to visit all the places on the fort.

Gallery

See also 
 List of forts in Maharashtra
 List of forts in India
 Marathi People
 Battles involving the Maratha Empire
 Maratha Army
 Maratha titles
 Military history of India
 List of people involved in the Maratha Empire

References 

Buildings and structures of the Maratha Empire
Forts in Nashik district
16th-century forts in India